Marat Jumakeyev (born 27 November 1973 in USSR) is a Kyrgyzstani professional football player and manager.

Career
In 1991 Jumakeyev began his professional career with the FC Alga Bishkek. In 1994–1996 he played for the FC Kainar, and in 1997 he returned to Alga-PVO Bishkek. The following year he went back to Kazakhstan, where he defended the colors of clubs FC Astana Aqmola, CSKA-Kairat and Mangystau Aktau. In summer 2001 he once more returned to Alga-PVO Bishkek and played until the club dissolved.

In 1992, he made his debut for the Kyrgyzstan national team.

In 2011, he completed coaching license courses at the Asian Football Confederation. In 2013, he coached FC Issyk-Kol Karakol. Since 2014, he has been a coach of the FC Manas.

References

External links
 

1973 births
Living people
Kyrgyzstani footballers
Kyrgyzstan international footballers
Kyrgyzstani expatriate footballers
Association football defenders
FC Alga Bishkek players
FC Zhetysu players
FC Zhenis Astana players
FC Kairat players
FC Caspiy players
Kyrgyzstani football managers